The Wadden Sea National Parks in Denmark, Germany and the Netherlands are located along the German Bight of the North Sea. In Germany and Denmark they also mark the area of the UNESCO World Heritage Site of the Wadden Sea. Divided from each other by administrative borders, they form a single ecological entity. The purpose of the national parks is the protection of the Wadden Sea ecoregion.

Denmark 
 Wadden Sea National Park (Nationalpark Vadehavet), from Blåvandshuk to Rudbøl in Denmark

Germany 
 Schleswig-Holstein Wadden Sea National Park, comprising the west coast of Schleswig-Holstein and the North Frisian Islands
 Hamburg Wadden Sea National Park, extending from the mouth of the Elbe to the tiny islands of Neuwerk and Scharhörn, part of Hamburg
 Lower Saxony Wadden Sea National Park, comprising the northern coast of Lower Saxony and including the East Frisian Islands

Netherlands 
 Lauwersmeer National Park consists of the southern and eastern parts of the Lauwersmeer in the Netherlands
 Schiermonnikoog National Park covers the majority of the island Schiermonnikoog
 Dunes of Texel National Park is located on the Dutch island of Texel and includes dune systems.

Gallery

See also 
Wadden Sea / UNESCO Official Website 
Wadden Sea

Protected areas of Hamburg
Protected areas of Lower Saxony
Protected areas of Schleswig-Holstein
Ramsar sites in Germany
Ramsar sites in Denmark
Ramsar sites in the Netherlands
Marine reserves
Transboundary protected areas